Anchor bottler is a term used by cola beverage manufacturers for their major bottlers around the world.

The Coca-Cola Company employed the strategy of "anchor bottlers" to penetrate markets like China, Eastern Europe and Russia.

Notable anchor bottlers include:

 The Coca-Cola Refreshments subsidiary of The Coca-Cola Company, the company's anchor bottler for the North American market.
 Coca-Cola European Partners, spun out by The Coca-Cola Company in 1986 and now covering Belgium, continental France, Great Britain, Germany, Spain, Portugal, Luxembourg, Monaco, the Netherlands, Norway and Sweden, as a result of a three-way combination completed on May 28, 2016, of the former Coca-Cola Enterprises, the Coca-Cola bottler covering Spain and Portugal and the Coca-Cola bottler in Germany.
 Coca-Cola Hellenic Bottling Company ("CCHBC") formed from the de-merger of Coca-Cola Amatil's  eastern European interests into Coca-Cola Beverages and that company's subsequent merger with the Hellenic Bottling Company, now covering 28 countries in eastern Europe, Russia and Nigeria
 Coca-Cola Amatil covering Australia, New Zealand, Fiji, Indonesia and Papua New Guinea;
 Coca-Cola Icecek ("CCI") covering Turkey; Middle Eastern (Iraq, Jordan, Syria and Pakistan) and Central Asian (Kazakhstan, Azerbaijan, Kyrgyzstan, Turkmenistan and Tajikistan) regions
 Coca-Cola Beverages Philippines, Inc., covering the Philippines
 The Pepsi Beverages subsidiary of PepsiCo is the company's anchor bottler for the North American market.
 The bottling subsidiary of Dr Pepper Snapple, formerly the Dr Pepper/Seven Up Bottling Group, is the anchor bottler for most of the company's soda brands in the US.
 Carlsberg Breweries, which in 2001 took over part of the Scandinavian market from Coca-Cola Nordic Beverages after Orkla and Carlsberg A/S merged their beverages operations, while Coca-Cola took over Swedish and Norwegian activities and the Icelandic factory was sold to local investors.
Swire covering the Greater China region.

References

External links 
Coca-Cola European Partners website 
CCHBC website
Coca-Cola Amatil website

Soft drinks
Bottling companies